The Château d'Oberhof is a castle situated in the commune of Saverne in the département of Bas-Rhin. It was mentioned in 1417 as the residence of the bishop of Strasbourg. Since 1852, it houses the sous-préfecture of the arrondissement of Saverne. It is a listed historical monument since 1934.

References

Buildings and structures completed in the 15th century
Castles in Bas-Rhin